Selvarajh Mathushan (born 10 August 1996) is a Sri Lankan cricketer. He made his first-class debut for Tamil Union Cricket and Athletic Club in the 2018–19 Premier League Tournament on 17 January 2019.

References

External links
 

1996 births
Living people
Sri Lankan cricketers
Tamil Union Cricket and Athletic Club cricketers
Place of birth missing (living people)